Gian Antonio Grassi (died 1602) was a Roman Catholic prelate who served as Bishop of Faenza (1585–1602).

Biography
On 18 March 1585, Gian Antonio Grassi was appointed during the papacy of Pope Gregory XIII as Bishop of Faenza.
He served as Bishop of Faenza until his death on 30 July 1602.

References

Bibliography

External links and additional sources
 (for Chronology of Bishops) 
 (for Chronology of Bishops)  

16th-century Italian Roman Catholic bishops
17th-century Italian Roman Catholic bishops
Bishops appointed by Pope Gregory XIII
1602 deaths